The Modane Underground Laboratory (LSM) (also known as the Fréjus Underground Laboratory) is a subterranean particle physics laboratory located within the Fréjus Road Tunnel near Modane, France. It is jointly operated by the French National Center for Scientific Research and the Atomic Energy and Alternative Energies Commission in partnership with the University of Savoie.

, it is the deepest laboratory in the European Union.

The LSM was built between 1981 and 1982 to host the "Fréjus" iron tracking calorimeter proton decay experiment. Today the site houses the Neutrino Ettore Majorana Observatory (NEMO) search for neutrinoless double beta decay, the EDELWEISS dark matter detector, and other particle detectors.

References

External links
Laboratoire Souterrain de Modane

Particle physics facilities
Science and technology in Europe
Underground laboratories
Laboratories in France